Cakewalk is a traditional African American form of music and dance.

Cakewalk may refer to:

Arts and entertainment
 Cakewalk (carnival game), a game played at carnivals, funfairs, and fundraising events
Cakewalk (film), a 2019 Hindi film
 Cakewalk, a play by Peter Feibleman about his relationship with Lillian Hellman
 Cakewalk, a game for the Atari 2600 by CommaVid
 Golliwogg's Cakewalk, a composition for solo piano by Claude Debussy
 "Cakewalk" (Oscar Peterson composition), a jazz composition by Oscar Peterson

Other uses
 Cakewalk (company), a Boston-based company which produced music software
 Cakewalk (sequencer), their music sequencing software
 Cakewalk by BandLab, Digital audio workstation